Folsom is an unincorporated community in Custer County, in the U.S. state of South Dakota.

History
A post office called Folsom was established in 1886, and remained in operation until 1948. The community was named after Frances Folsom Cleveland, First Lady of the United States.

References

Unincorporated communities in Custer County, South Dakota
Unincorporated communities in South Dakota